Arcanum may refer to:

Music 
 Arcanum (album), a 1996 album by Acoustic Alchemy
 The Arcanum (album), a 2000 album by Suidakra
 Arcanum, a piece of music by Ezequiel Viñao
 Arcanum, song off the album Dog Whistle by Show Me the Body
 Arckanum, a black metal band

Other uses 
 Arcanum, Ohio, a village in the United States
 Arcanum (encyclical), a 1880 Catholic encyclical letter
 Arcanum (comics), an American comic book published by Image Comics
 Arcanum: Of Steamworks and Magick Obscura, a 2001 computer role-playing game
 The Arcanum (role-playing game), a 1981 pen-and-paper role-playing game
 The Arcanum (novel), a 2005 novel by Thomas Wheeler
 The Arcanum (non fiction), a 1998 non-fiction book on the history of porcelain
 The Grand Arcanum, the secret of the philosopher's stone in alchemy

See also 
 Arcandam
 Arcana (disambiguation)
 Arcane (disambiguation)